Bangladesh Petroleum Institute is an autonomous national research institute that carries out research on hydrocarbon and provide technical assistance to organizations in the petroleum industry and is located in Uttara, Dhaka, Bangladesh.

History
The institute was created in January 1981, it is under the Ministry of Energy and Mineral Resources of Bangladesh. In 2004 Bangladesh Petroleum Institute act was passed by the parliament which made allocated more resource to skill development in the oil, gas and petroleum industry.

References

Organisations based in Dhaka
1981 establishments in Bangladesh
Research institutes in Bangladesh
Petroleum organizations
Petroleum in Bangladesh
Ministry of Power, Energy and Mineral Resources